Paul Coia (born 19 June 1955 in Glasgow) is a Scottish television presenter and continuity announcer who was the first voice to be heard on Channel 4 on its launch in 1982. His career originally began in the late 1970s as a DJ and in the early 1980s he became an announcer. He has presented television shows including Pebble Mill at One and Catchword. He is currently covering shows for BBC Radio London.

Early life and career
Coia was educated at Merrylee Convent, John Ogilvie Hall and St Aloysius' College and then at the University of Glasgow and Paisley College of Technology (now University of the West of Scotland), before going into hospital radio and eventually getting a job as a disc jockey at Radio Clyde. He and his twin Gerard were born in 1955, and he had two younger siblings, Martin and Denise. His ambition was to become a dentist but it remained unrealised as his exam results were not to the level required.

In the late 1970s a young Paul Coia DJ'd at Paisley Tech students union, now the university of West of Scotland. In the early 1980s Coia became a continuity announcer for Scottish Television. After dropping his script and continuing by ad libbing, Coia was given his own chat show, Meet Paul Coia.

In 1982 he joined Channel 4 on its launch and was the first voice heard on air. Unusually for continuity of the time, Coia could also be seen in-vision, usually before closedown. Subsequently, he became a presenter of BBC1's daytime magazine programme, Pebble Mill at One. and BBC 2's 6:55 where he replaced Starsky and Hutch actor David Soul.

During 1987, Coia made his second chat show, this time for Grampian Television The Paul Coia Show which was broadcast also on Scottish Television, and he also made his first gameshow, Split Second.

In 1988 Coia became the host of the BBC gameshow Catchword. He has since presented a number of other quizzes on various satellite and cable channels.

He stood in once with his wife Debbie Greenwood, a former Miss Great Britain winner, for Gloria Hunniford's afternoon chat show on Five. Coia and Greenwood also sat in for Derek and Ellen Jameson on the late-night show on BBC Radio 2, and Coia (broadcasting solo) also deputised for Ken Bruce, Ed Stewart and other presenters on that station. He is a former Scottish Radio Personality of the Year.

In 2002, Coia created a quiz show for the BBC, The Enemy Within.

Coia has launched three TV channels – Channel Four, The Holiday Channel and Disney's ABC 1, and has presented on all the main terrestrial channels in the UK, as well as hosting a quiz, Spellbound, for Sky.

In 2005, Coia returned to Radio Clyde where he presented on the weekday lunchtime show from 12 – 3pm on Clyde 2, He covered for veteran presenter Bill Smith A year later, Coia presented on Saturday afternoons from 2–6pm.

Coia was a continuity announcer and trail voiceover (all pre-recorded) for the now-defunct digital channel ABC1. He has also been heard on 102.2 Smooth Radio since February 2008. Coia took over the Drivetime show from December 2008 until the end of 2010 after Martin Collins left the station. In April 2013 he became a Sunday morning presenter for BBC Radio Berkshire, discussing religious issues of the day and locality.

In 2017, he started to present BBC Radio London cover shows.

On 2 November 2022, forty years to the day after he introduced the first programme to be broadcast on Channel 4, Coia once again provided the continuity announcement for that day's edition of Countdown.

Coia also works as a Presentation and Media coach and corporate speaker, hosting events and coaching executives in many countries. He occasionally presents on Radio Jackie.

Personal life
Coia lives in London with his wife, former Miss Great Britain and QVC presenter Debbie Greenwood. They have two daughters, Annalie and Luisa. He has a twin brother Gerard, and a sister and brother, Denise and Martin, who are also twins.

TV shows
 Meet Paul Coia (1980 Scottish TV)
 Pebble Mill at One (1983–86)
 Six Fifty-five (1983) 
 Zig Zag (BBC Schools programme) 1984–90
 Domesday Detectives (1986)
 The Paul Coia Show (Grampian TV. 1986–88)
 Split Second (1988)
 Catchword (1988–1995)
 Telethon '88, 90 & '92 – Host for Scotland.
 BBC Railwatch (1989) – Correspondent
 Rab C Nesbitt: "Holiday" (1990)
 Garden Party (1990–1991, BBC)
 Press Your Luck (1991–1992 HTV)
 Spellbound (1994–1996, Sky One)
 Don't Drink the Water (1997)
 Heaven Knows (1997–98)
 Pull the Other One (1998)
 Flash in the Pan (1999)

References

External links
Official website
Paul Coia (BBC Radio Berkshire)
Entry at UK Gameshows

1955 births
Living people
Mass media people from Glasgow
Scottish radio personalities
Scottish television presenters
Scottish people of Italian descent
Scottish game show hosts
Alumni of the University of Glasgow
People educated at St Aloysius' College, Glasgow
BBC Radio 2 presenters
Alumni of the University of the West of Scotland